Davos is a municipality in Switzerland.

Davos also may refer to:

 Davos (album), a 2015 album by Computer Magic
 Davos (comics), a supervillain in Marvel Comics' Iron Fist comics
 Davos Platz, a village of Davos
 Davos Seaworth, a fictional character created by George R. R. Martin, appearing in A Song of Ice and Fire
 HC Davos, a professional Swiss hockey club in Davos, Switzerland
 Lake Davos, a lake in Davos
 World Economic Forum, which hosts an annual meeting in Davos, Switzerland, also known as Davos Forums

See also
 
 Davros, a character in the British television series Doctor Who